The East of England Showground is a large showground area (667,731sqm) located on East of England Way in Peterborough, Cambridgeshire, England. The Showground is owned by Bellway as of around 2019 and the site currently includes the East of England Arena and Events Centre and a motorcycle speedway stadium. In September 2021, EEAS entered into a land promotion agreement with Asset Earning Power Group (AEPG). The purpose of the agreement was to develop new leisure facilities on the site and further the association with the Anglia Ruskin University.

East of England Arena and Events Centre 
The East of England Arena and Events Centre hosts an array of various events throughout the year, including music and comedy events, exhibitions, trade fairs, vehicle shows, weddings and festivals.

Speedway stadium (East of England Arena) 
The Showground is also the home of the Peterborough Panthers speedway team who race in the SGB Premiership, the highest level of Speedway in the United Kingdom. The track record of 57.4 seconds was set on 13 May 2019 by Danny King.

History 
The venue first hosted speedway on 12 June 1970, when Peterborough competed in their inaugural season 1970 British League Division Two season.

The Peterborough track was also the host of the 2002 Speedway World Cup Final which took place on 10 August. Australia, with Jason Crump, Leigh Adams, Todd Wiltshire, and Peterborough Panthers riders Ryan Sullivan and Jason Lyons, won their second consecutive Speedway World Cup defeating Denmark, Sweden, Poland and the Czech Republic. The Showground also hosted the 2001 Under-21 World Championship final won by Poland's Dawid Kujawa.

In 2022, by the owners Asset Earning Power Group (AEPG) that Arena would undergo redevelopment, which would include demolition of the grandstand and speedway track. Peterborough Panthers came to a short term agreement with AEPG that it could be used until the end of the 2023 season.

See also
Peterborough Panthers

References

Speedway venues in England
Sports venues in Cambridgeshire
Sport in Peterborough